Pine River Capital Management L.P. is an asset management firm. The company is currently managed by founder and CEO Brian Taylor and 6 partners.

History
Brian Taylor founded Pine River in 2002 to pursue opportunities in global relative value trading with an initial investment of $5.3 million.
The firm was initially located in Pine River, Minnesota, before moving to Minneapolis, Minnesota in 2003. In 2007, Pine River relocated to Minnetonka. Pine River's various portfolio management teams take a relative value approach to investing, seeking to identify dislocations between prices of related financial instruments and markets.

Pine River Capital Management L.P. became registered as an investment advisor with the US Securities and Futures Commission in January 2006. Pine River Capital Management (UK) Limited became authorized by the British Financial Services Authority to manage investments in the UK in January 2004.

Between October 2009 and August 2020, a subsidiary of Pine River was the external investment manager of Two Harbors Investment Corp., a publicly listed real estate investment trust that invests in mortgage-backed securities and related instruments.

Between June 2017 and December 2020, Pine River was the external manager of Granite Point Mortgage Trust, a publicly listed real estate investment trust that focused on directly originating, investing in, and managing senior floating-rate commercial mortgage loans and other debt and debt-like commercial real estate investments.

In 2017, following a wave of withdrawals, Pine River closed one of its master funds.

References

External links
Official site
Current Portfolio Holdings

Financial services companies established in 2002
Investment management companies of the United States
Companies based in Minnesota
Hedge funds